Dionysius V (22 March 1820 – 25 August 1891) was Ecumenical Patriarch of Constantinople from 1887 to 1891.

1820 births
1891 deaths
People from Edirne
Bishops of Nicaea
Bishops of Adrianople
19th-century Ecumenical Patriarchs of Constantinople